In mathematics, the least-upper-bound property (sometimes called completeness or supremum property or l.u.b. property) is a fundamental property of the real numbers. Not every (partially) ordered set has the least upper bound property. For example, the set  of all rational numbers with its natural order does not have the least upper bound property.

The least-upper-bound property is one form of the completeness axiom for the real numbers, and is sometimes referred to as Dedekind completeness. It can be used to prove many of the fundamental results of real analysis, such as the intermediate value theorem, the Bolzano–Weierstrass theorem, the extreme value theorem, and the Heine–Borel theorem.  It is usually taken as an axiom in synthetic constructions of the real numbers, and it is also intimately related to the construction of the real numbers using Dedekind cuts. 

In order theory, this property can be generalized to a notion of completeness for any partially ordered set.   A linearly ordered set that is dense and has the least upper bound property is called a linear continuum.

Statement of the property

Statement for real numbers
Let  be a non-empty set of real numbers.
 A real number  is called an upper bound for  if  for all .
The least-upper-bound property states that any non-empty set of real numbers that has an upper bound must have a least upper bound in real numbers.

Generalization to ordered sets

More generally, one may define upper bound and least upper bound for any subset of a partially ordered set , with “real number” replaced by “element of ”.

For example, the set  of rational numbers does not have the least-upper-bound property under the usual order.  For instance, the set

 

The construction of the real numbers using Dedekind cuts takes advantage of this failure by defining the irrational numbers as the least upper bounds of certain subsets of the rationals.

Proof

Logical status
The least-upper-bound property is equivalent to other forms of the completeness axiom, such as the convergence of Cauchy sequences or the nested intervals theorem.  The logical status of the property depends on the construction of the real numbers used: in the synthetic approach, the property is usually taken as an axiom for the real numbers (see least upper bound axiom); in a constructive approach, the property must be proved as a theorem, either directly from the construction or as a consequence of some other form of completeness.

Proof using Cauchy sequences
It is possible to prove the least-upper-bound property using the assumption that every Cauchy sequence of real numbers converges. Let  be a nonempty set of real numbers. If  has exactly one element, then its only element is a least upper bound. So consider  with more than one element, and suppose that  has an upper bound . Define sequences  and  recursively as follows:
 If it is, let  and let .
 Otherwise there must be an element  in  so that .  Let  and let .

Applications
The least-upper-bound property of  can be used to prove many of the main foundational theorems in real analysis.

Intermediate value theorem
In this case, the intermediate value theorem states that  must have a root in the interval . This theorem can be proved by considering the set
.
That is,  is the initial segment of  that takes negative values under .

Bolzano–Weierstrass theorem
The Bolzano–Weierstrass theorem for  states that every sequence  of real numbers in a closed interval  must have a convergent subsequence.  This theorem can be proved by considering the set

Clearly,

Extreme value theorem
Let  be a continuous function and let , where  if  has no upper bound. This can be proved by considering the set
.

Heine–Borel theorem
This statement can be proved by considering the set
.
By the least-upper-bound property,  has a least upper bound .  
Hence,  is itself an element of some open set , and it follows for  that  can be covered by finitely many  for some sufficiently small .
Consequently, .

History

The importance of the least-upper-bound property was first recognized by Bernard Bolzano in his 1817 paper Rein analytischer Beweis des Lehrsatzes dass zwischen je  zwey  Werthen,  die  ein  entgegengesetztes  Resultat  gewäahren,  wenigstens eine reelle Wurzel der Gleichung liege.

See also
 List of real analysis topics

Notes

References

Real analysis
Order theory
Articles containing proofs